Greg Olson may refer to:

 Greg Olson (baseball) (born 1960), American former baseball catcher
 Greg Olson (American football) (born 1963), American football coach

See also
 Gregg Olson (born 1966), American baseball pitcher
Greg Olsen (disambiguation)